Line notation is a typographical notation system using ASCII characters, most often used for chemical nomenclature.

Chemistry
 Cell notation for representation of an electrochemical cell
 Dyson / IUPAC (1944)
 Hayward (1961)
 International Chemical Identifier (InChI)
 Wiswesser Line Notation (WLN) (1952)
 Simplified molecular input line entry specification (SMILES)
 Smiles arbitrary target specification (SMARTS)
 SYBYL Line Notation (SLN)

Mathematics
 Mathematical markup language

Music
 GUIDO music notation

Chess 
 Forsyth–Edwards Notation

Notation
Chemical nomenclature
Musical notation